Staff Sergeant George T. Alexander Jr. (August 5, 1971 – October 22, 2005) was the 2,000th American soldier killed in combat in Iraq since the beginning of the 2003 Invasion of Iraq, according to the Associated Press. He was serving as a crewman on a M2 Bradley combat vehicle when he was mortally wounded.

Alexander, an African-American, died October 22, 2005, at the Brooke Army Medical Center in San Antonio, Texas after being treated for injuries sustained five days earlier, when an improvised explosive device detonated near his M2 Bradley in the city of Samarra.

A 1989 graduate of Chilton County High School, Alexander spent two years working as a construction labourer before joining the military as Desert Storm began.  At the time of his death, he was serving his third tour of duty in Iraq, assigned to the 1st Battalion, 15th Infantry Regiment, 3rd Brigade, 3rd Infantry Division, of Fort Benning, Georgia.

Media Attention
The United States media noted this death above many others, as it was the 2,000th since the start of active combat, a number generally recognized as significant. Articles ran on such sites as CNN.com  featuring the soldier. In contrast, the Pentagon downplayed the death — Lt. Col. Steven Boylan, a spokesman for the U.S. military in Iraq, told the Associated Press that "the 2,000 service members killed in Iraq supporting Operation Iraqi Freedom is not a milestone, it is an artificial mark on the wall set by individuals or groups with specific agendas and ulterior motives."

Alexander's death sparked Senators and Congressmen to debate the merits of the war again, something that had not been done in months, with Senators such as Dick Durbin making statements on the war.  Peace activists cast the 2,000th combat death as a milestone in what they believe to be an unnecessary and unwinnable war.  Immediately following the report of his death, six hundred anti-war protests and candlelight vigils were held in the United States on October 26, 2005.

See also
2003 invasion of Iraq media coverage

References

 Faulk, Kent.  "Soldier fought to make difference", The Birmingham News.  October 27, 2005.  Retrieved October 30, 2005.
 Salles, Andre.  "Vigil notes 2000 U.S. war dead", The Beacon News.  October 27, 2005.  Retrieved October 27, 2005.
 Cannon, Jason.  "Roadside bomb kills Clanton soldier", The Clanton Advertiser.  October 26, 2005.  Retrieved October 26, 2005.
 Parsons, Claudia & Quinn, Andrew.  "US military death toll in Iraq reaches 2,000", Reuters.  October 25, 2005.  Retrieved October 26, 2005.
 "DoD Identifies Army Casualty", United States Department of Defense.  October 25, 2005.  Retrieved October 29, 2005.

1971 births
2005 deaths
People from Killeen, Texas
United States Army non-commissioned officers
United States Army personnel of the Iraq War
American military personnel killed in the Iraq War
Military personnel from San Antonio
African-American United States Army personnel